Wilcza Wola  is a village in the administrative district of Gmina Dzikowiec, within Kolbuszowa County, Subcarpathian Voivodeship, in south-eastern Poland.

The village has an approximate population of 2,000.

References

Wilcza Wola